Octamasades (Scythian:) was briefly a king of the Scythian tribe of the Sindians and a son of Hecataeus and Tirgatao. He usurped the throne from his father some time in 383 BC after his failed war against Octamasades' mother, Tirgatao.

Name
The Greek name  is the Hellenisation of the Scythian language name , meaning "possessing greatness through his words."

Biography
Octamasades' accession to the throne was likely backed by the Sindian aristocracy, as his father was probably unpopular due to his previous affairs and having been restored by Satyrus I who perhaps made him even more unpopular. In the ensuing days of his accession to the throne, he was induced by his mother to make war on the Bosporan Kingdom who was at the time under the rule of the ambitious and militaristic ruler, Leucon. Heeding to his mother's words, he attacked the Bosporan city of Labrytai which provoked Leucon into a battle. It can be speculated that Leucon was already setting his sights in fully annexing the Sindians, and used this as an excuse to finally do so. In the following Battle of Labrytai, Leukon completely routed Octamasades' forces and forced him to flee into Scythia. After this battle, nothing more is known about him.

References

Scythian rulers
4th-century BC rulers
4th-century BC deaths